The 1989–90 Minnesota North Stars season was the North Stars' 23rd season.

Coached by Pierre Page, the team compiled a record of 36–40–4 for 76 points to finish the regular season 4th in the Norris Division. The North Stars were nearly unbeatable at the Met Center, winning 26, the best in the Norris Division and third-best home record overall. In the playoffs, they lost the division semi-finals 4–3 to the Chicago Blackhawks.

Offseason

NHL Draft

Regular season

Final standings

Schedule and results

Player statistics

Forwards
Note: GP = Games played; G = Goals; A = Assists; Pts = Points; PIM = Penalty minutes

Defencemen
Note: GP = Games played; G = Goals; A = Assists; Pts = Points; PIM = Penalty minutes

Goaltending
Note: GP = Games played; W = Wins; L=  Losses; T = Ties; SO = Shutouts; GAA = Goals against average

Playoffs

Awards and records

References
 North Stars on Hockey Database

Minn
Minn
Minnesota North Stars seasons
Minnesota North Stars
Minnesota North Stars